Grewia rothii is a species of flowering plant in India and Sri Lanka.

In culture 
Known as "bora daminiya" in Sinhala and "taviddai" in Tamil.

Physiology 
Flowers - small, polygamous; Inflorescence- umbels, 1-4 in axils.

Uses 
Bark is used in fiber industry.

References

rothii
Flora of Sri Lanka